Kingetsu (written: 金月) is a Japanese surname. Notable people with the surname include:

, Japanese voice actress and singer
, Japanese screenwriter

Japanese-language surnames